Madhur Jaffrey CBE (née Bahadur; born 13 August 1933) is an Indian-born British-American actress, food and travel writer, and television personality. She is recognized for bringing Indian cuisine to the western hemisphere with her debut cookbook, An Invitation to Indian Cooking (1973), which was inducted into the James Beard Foundation’s Cookbook Hall of Fame in 2006. She has written over a dozen cookbooks and appeared on several related television programmes, the most notable of which was Madhur Jaffrey's Indian Cookery, which premiered in the UK in 1982. She was the food consultant at the now-closed Dawat, which was considered by many food critics to be among the best Indian restaurants in New York City.

She was instrumental in bringing together filmmakers James Ivory and Ismail Merchant and acted in several of their films such as Shakespeare Wallah (1965), for which she won the Silver Bear for Best Actress award at the 15th Berlin International Film Festival. She has appeared in dramas on radio, stage and television.

In 2004, she was named an honorary Commander of the Order of the British Empire (CBE) in recognition of her services to cultural relations between the United Kingdom, India and the United States, through her achievements in film, television and cookery. In 2022, she was awarded the Padma Bhushan from the Government of India, which is the third highest civilian award.

Her childhood memoir of India during the final years of the British Raj, Climbing the Mango Trees, was published in 2006.

Early life 
Jaffrey was born in Civil Lines, Delhi, into a Mathur Kayastha Hindu joint family. She is the fifth of six children of Lala Raj Bans Bahadur (1899–1974) and his wife, Kashmiran Rani (1903–1971). Madhur's grandfather, Rai Bahadur Raj Narain (1864–1950), had built a sprawling family compound, named Number 7 Raj Narain Marg, by the Yamuna river amid fruit orchards.

When Jaffrey was about two years old, her father accepted a position in a family-run concern, Ganesh Flour Mills, and moved to Kanpur as the manager of a vanaspati ghee factory there. In Kanpur, Jaffrey attended St. Mary's Convent School along with her elder sisters, Lalit and Kamal. In kindergarten at the age of five, she played the role of the brown mouse in a musical version of the Pied Piper of Hamelin. The family lived in Kanpur for eight years, until her grandfather's deteriorating health caused a move back to Delhi in 1944.

In Delhi, Jaffrey attended Queen Mary's Higher Secondary School where her history teacher, Mrs McKelvie, encouraged her to participate in school plays. Jaffrey played the role of Titania in William Shakespeare's play A Midsummer Night's Dream followed by the lead role in Robin Hood and His Merry Men. Madhur's brothers, Brij Bans Bahadur and Krishen Bans Bahadur, who were much older than her, were enrolled in St. Stephen's College, Delhi. Every winter, St. Stephen's students put on a Shakespearean play that Jaffrey would watch avidly from the front row.

A supporter of Mahatma Gandhi's demand for Indian independence from British rule, Jaffrey spent some time each day spinning khadi and delivered several large spools of thread to a central collection center in Delhi.

In 1947, Jaffrey experienced first-hand the effects of the partition of India. At school, her classmates split into two on the issue of partition; the Muslim girls supported the idea while the Hindus were against it. On August 15 she watched the transfer of power at India Gate and got a clear glimpse of Jawaharlal Nehru and Lord Mountbatten coming down Rajpath in an open horse carriage. The massive multi-directional migration that began almost immediately afterwards caused riots and killing in Delhi. The male members of her family guarded their house with guns that they had previously used only for hunting game. At school, all her Muslim classmates left without a farewell. In 1948, a few days before Mahatma Gandhi was shot dead, she attended one of his prayer meetings at Birla House and sang bhajans. She heard the news of his assassination on the radio, followed by Jawaharlal Nehru's address later that night, "the light has gone out of our lives, and there is darkness everywhere." She saw Gandhi's funeral procession at Rajpath and witnessed his cremation at Rajghat.

At home, Jaffrey's family primarily ate food prepared by servants but supervised by the women of the family. They occasionally indulged in Mughlai cuisine bought in the bylanes of Old Delhi, like bedmi aloo, seekh kebab, shami kebab, rumali roti and bakarkhani. Refugees from Punjab who settled in Delhi after partition brought their own style of cooking. Moti Mahal, a dhaba in Daryaganj, introduced tandoori chicken and then went on to invent butter chicken and dal makhani. Jaffrey found Punjabi food's simplicity and freshness very enticing and routinely picked up tandoori food from Moti Mahal for family picnics.

At school, the subject of domestic science included learning dishes like blancmange, whose bland taste drove Jaffrey to dismiss the cookery lessons as preparing "British invalid foods from circa 1930". However, at the time of the practical examination, her class was asked to make a dish from an assortment of potatoes, tomatoes, onions, garlic, ginger and Indian spices in a pot over wood to be lit with matches. Jaffrey did her best but guessed that she failed the subject of domestic science altogether.

Jaffrey and her cousins would regularly answer summons from the nearby All India Radio station for parts in radio plays or children's programs. As she was paid a small fee for each session, Jaffrey considered this to be her first professional work.

Meanwhile, Jaffrey's father had moved to Daurala as general manager of Daurala Sugar Works, a factory owned by family friends, the Shri Ram family. Jaffrey, along with her brothers, her younger sister, Veena, and her mother remained behind in Delhi in to avoid disrupting the children's education. During this period, Jaffrey's elder sisters were at boarding school in Nainital. In the letters that they exchanged with their siblings and cousins at Delhi, they addressed each other only by their initials. This tradition cemented over time so that Jaffrey became M for her circle of close friends and family. Jaffrey's father eventually returned from Daurala and joined Delhi Cloth Mills, a textile factory owned by the Shri Ram family.

Delhi (1950–1955) 
From 1950 to 1953 Jaffrey attended Miranda House, a women's college, where she gained a B.A. degree in English Honours with a minor in philosophy. 

She took part in her college's all-women productions of Hamlet and The Importance of Being Earnest. She appeared in The Comedy of Errors performed by St. Stephen's College.

In 1951, Jaffrey joined the Unity Theatre, an English language repertory company founded by Saeed Jaffrey in New Delhi. She auditioned for the role of the Queen's Reader in Jean Cocteau's play The Eagle Has Two Heads just four days before the opening but was cast in the role. The next play that she did with Saeed was Christopher Fry's A Phoenix Too Frequent.

After graduation from Miranda House in 1953, Jaffrey joined All India Radio, where Saeed Jaffrey was an announcer. She worked as a disc jockey at night. Saeed and Jaffrey fell in love, and dated at Gaylord, a restaurant in Connaught Place.

During this period, Jaffrey also met Ruth Prawer Jhabvala, a British novelist who had moved to Civil Lines, Delhi, after marriage to Cyrus Jhabvala, an Indian architect, in 1951. Jaffrey answered a casting call by Prawer Jhabvala and worked with her on All India Radio plays. The protagonists of Prawer Jhabvala's first novel, To Whom She Will (1955), a young couple who work at a radio station in Delhi and fall in love, were based on Madhur and Saeed Jaffrey. The novel was published in America the following year as Amrita (1956).

In early 1955, Jaffrey was in the audience at St. Stephen's College, Delhi, for a programme of literary readings by Sybil Thorndike and Lewis Casson, married English actors who toured internationally in Shakespearean productions. Later that year, the Unity Theatre put on a performance of Tennessee Williams' one-act play, Auto-da-Fé, in which Madhur played the rigidly moralistic mother to Saeed's young postal worker, Eloi. The last play that Madhur did with Saeed was Othello in which Saeed was cast as Iago while Madhur played Iago's wife, Emilia.

Jaffrey decided to pursue acting as a profession. She won a grant from the British government that she could use to pay for education at the Royal Academy of Dramatic Art (RADA).

The head of the British Council in India was impressed by her performance in Auto-da-Fé and offered her a scholarship. Armed with these two sources of money, Jaffrey arrived at Southampton on 6 December 1955 on the P&O liner  from Bombay.

London (1955–1957) 
Jaffrey joined the Royal Academy of Dramatic Art (RADA) with Diana Rigg, Siân Phillips and Glenda Jackson as her contemporaries. She won a scholarship from RADA after an audition. This supplemented her earlier grant and scholarship. She also picked up minor acting roles on BBC television and radio. Her father would send her a small amount of money periodically and her total income proved sufficient to live modestly in London. She rented rooms from at least two different landlords before settling down in a bedsit in Brent with a young Jewish family, the Golds, who allowed her to use their kitchen and their utensils to cook her own food. Her landlady, Blanche Gold, was roughly her age. Blanche had one child and was pregnant.

Jaffrey found British food and Indian restaurants of that time to be terrible. The grey roast beef and overcooked cabbage with watery potatoes served at the fifth-floor canteen of RADA were unappetizing. She wrote to her mother, begging her for recipes of the home cooked meals of her childhood. Her mother responded with recipes written in Hindi on onionskin paper in letters sent via airmail. The very first letter was dated 19 March 1956 and included recipes for meat spiced with cinnamon, cardamom and bay, a cauliflower dish, and egg curry with hard-boiled eggs. The first recipe that she tried was jeera aloo (potatoes with cumin). She bought pumpernickel from a neighborhood Jewish bakery as a substitute for chapatis.

In late 1955, Saeed Jaffrey won a Fulbright scholarship to study drama in America the following year. In spring 1956, he approached Jaffrey's parents in Delhi for her hand in marriage but they refused because they felt that his financial prospects as an actor did not appear sound. Jaffrey got her father's permission to marry Saeed eventually. In summer 1956, Saeed flew to London on his way to America and proposed to Jaffrey. She refused but gave him a tour of RADA where she pointed out English actors, such as Peter O'Toole, whom she thought would soon have a high profile in the profession.

In 1957 Jaffrey graduated from RADA with honours. Not knowing whether to stay on in London, join a repertory company or go back to India, she wrote to Saeed describing her dilemma. Saeed had just graduated from Catholic University of America's Department of Speech and Drama and had been selected to act in summer stock plays at St. Michael's Playhouse in Winooski, Vermont. Seeing Saeed troubled by Jaffrey's letter, Reverend Gilbert V. Hartke, the department head at Catholic University, arranged for Jaffrey to teach pantomime at St. Michael's Playhouse at Winooski that summer. Father Hartke also arranged for her to go to Catholic University on a partial scholarship and work at the Drama School library in order to meet her living expenses.

New York City (1958–1969) 
In September 1957 Jaffrey stayed in Washington, D.C., with Saeed, who had returned there to rehearse for the 1957–58 season with the National Players, a professional touring company that performed classical plays all over America. Midway through the tour, Saeed returned to Washington, D.C. from Miami to marry Madhur in a modest civil ceremony. The next day, they travelled to New York City where Madhur got a job as a tour guide to the United Nations, while Saeed did public relations work for the Government of India Tourist Office. Between 1959 and 1963, Madhur and Saeed had three daughters: Meera, Zia and Sakina.

In September 1958, Ismail Merchant arrived from Bombay to attend the New York University Stern School of Business. Merchant had heard of Saeed from his theater days in Delhi. He himself wanted to produce plays and make movies. Saeed was then playing the lead at Lee Strasberg's Actors Studio in an Off-Broadway production of Blood Wedding, a tragedy by Spanish dramatist Federico García Lorca. Merchant approached Saeed with a proposal to put on a Broadway production of The Little Clay Cart, starring the Jaffreys. Saeed took him home for dinner, where he met Madhur, who was heavily pregnant with the Jaffreys' first child.

The following year, James Ivory, then an emerging film maker from California, approached Saeed Jaffrey to provide the narration for his short film about Indian miniature painting, The Sword and the Flute (1959). Saeed brought Ivory home for dinner and introduced him to Madhur. When The Sword and the Flute screened in New York City in 1961, the Jaffreys encouraged Merchant to attend the screening, where he met Ivory for the first time. They subsequently met regularly at the Jaffreys' dinners and cemented their relationship into a lifetime partnership, both personal and professional. The Jaffreys planned to go back to India, start a travelling company and tour with it. They would often discuss this idea with James Ivory and started writing a script in his brownstone on East 64th Street.

The Jaffreys soon expanded their social circle to include other members of the Indian community in New York City who were involved in the arts. They regularly hosted large dinners cooked by Madhur, who was determined to master everything, including biryani and pulao.

In 1962, Madhur and Saeed appeared in Rolf Forsberg's Off-Broadway production of A Tenth of an Inch Makes The Difference. Their performance was described by The New York Times drama critic, Milton Esterow, as "sensitive acting" that made up "the brightest part of the evening". The pay for such roles was generally $10/hour.

By 1965, the Jaffreys' marriage had collapsed. Madhur arranged for their children to live with her parents and sister in Delhi while Madhur went to Mexico for the formal divorce proceedings. The divorce was finalized in 1966.

Madhur visited to India for the shooting of Shakespeare Wallah (1965). After the film's shooting was complete, she lived in India with her children until Ismail Merchant decided that she needed to be at the Berlin International Film Festival because he had entered the film in competition there. In Berlin, she won the Silver Bear for Best Actress award. Sanford Allen, a violinist she had met when she was a guide at the Lincoln Center for the Performing Arts in New York City, sent her a bunch of roses on her win. Jaffrey returned to New York City when the film was screened at the New York Film Festival. She and Sanford Allen met again and decided to pursue a relationship seriously.

In 1966 Ismail Merchant, in search of further publicity for the film, decided to cultivate The New York Times food critic Craig Claiborne. He persuaded Claiborne to profile Jaffrey as an actress who could also cook. When Claiborne agreed, Jaffrey borrowed a friend's apartment in which to meet him since she felt she could not do so in the one-bedroom apartment on Eleventh Street that she shared with Allen. She rearranged the furniture in the borrowed apartment and made stuffed green peppers, koftas in sour cream and cucumber raita. 

In 1967, Jaffrey traveled to India to attend a black-tie premiere of Shakespeare Wallah in Delhi hosted by the British High Commissioner to India, John Freeman and his wife, Catherine. At the premiere she met Marlon Brando, an actor Jaffrey admired deeply for his method acting technique. Brando was in India to raise money for UNICEF and the film premiere also served as a fund-raiser. Later that year, Jaffrey shot scenes for Merchant Ivory's next film, The Guru (1969). She returned from India with her children. The family, along with Sanford Allen, moved into a 14th-floor apartment in a Greenwich Village co-op. In order to better provide for her children, she became a freelance writer for food and travel magazines, covering subjects as diverse as paintings, music, dance, drama, sculpture, and architecture.

In 1969, Madhur married Sanford Allen, who at the time was a violinist with the New York Philharmonic Orchestra.

Merchant Ivory films
Madhur Jaffrey was instrumental in introducing James Ivory and Ismail Merchant to one another.

When Merchant and Ivory went to India to make The Householder (1963) they met Shashi Kapoor and his in-laws, the Kendals. Geoffrey Kendal and his wife, Laura Liddell, had a traveling theatre company, Shakespeareana, that performed plays by Shakespeare pan India. Combining the Jaffreys' original idea with the real-life Shakespeareana, Merchant and Ivory came up with their next film Shakespeare Wallah (1965). Ruth Prawer Jhabvala was persuaded to write a movie star role for Madhur. Saeed was dropped from the project because the Jaffreys' marriage had collapsed at this point.

When Madhur travelled to India for the shooting of Shakespeare Wallah, her first shots were in Kasauli, a hill station. The hairpin bends on the drive there caused her nausea and vomiting, leading the crew to despair that a person so petite and sickly could ever play a glamorous film star. Kenneth Tynan, a film critic for The Observer, described her performance as "a ravishing study in felinity".

She went on to act in further Merchant Ivory films like The Guru (1969), Autobiography of a Princess (1976), Heat and Dust (1983), directed by Ivory, and The Perfect Murder (1988). She starred as the title character in their film Cotton Mary (1999) and co-directed it with Merchant.

Other films and television
Madhur Jaffrey has appeared in Six Degrees of Separation (1993), Vanya on 42nd Street (1994), Flawless (1999) and Prime (2005). She starred in and produced ABCD (1999) and guest-starred in the Law & Order: Special Victims Unit episode "Name" as a psychiatrist, and the Law & Order: Criminal Intent episode "The Healer" as a lecturer. In 1985, she was in the Hindi film Saagar where she played the role of Kamladevi, Rishi Kapoor's grandmother. In 1992–94, she appeared with Billie Whitelaw in the British television series Firm Friends. In 1999, she appeared with daughter Sakina Jaffrey in the film Chutney Popcorn. In Cosmopolitan (2003), a film broadcast on PBS, she played a traditional Hindu wife who suddenly leaves her husband. She also starred alongside Deborah Kerr in the 1985 movie The Assam Garden. In 2009 she appeared with Aasif Mandvi in Today's Special, adapted from Mandvi's play about a sous chef who is forced to run his father's tandoori restaurant in Queens. In 2012 she played a doctor in A Late Quartet who diagnoses Christopher Walken's character with Parkinson's disease. She appeared as the older version of the Indian super heroine character Celsius, in her civilian identity Arani Desai, in a 2019 episode of the DC Universe series  Doom Patrol.

Theatre
In 1962, she appeared in A Tenth of an Inch Makes the Difference by Rolf Forsberg. In 1969, she appeared in The Guide, based on the novel by R. K. Narayan, and in 1970, she appeared in Conduct Unbecoming, written by Barry England. In 1993, she appeared in Two Rooms by Lee Blessing.
In 1999, she appeared in Last Dance at Dum Dum by Ayub Khan-Din. In 2004, Jaffrey appeared in Bombay Dreams on Broadway, where she played the main character's grandmother (Shanti). In 2005, she appeared in India Awakening by Anne Marie Cummings.

Cooking
Jaffrey is the author of cookbooks of Indian, Asian, and world vegetarian cuisines. Many have become best-sellers; some have won James Beard Foundation awards. She has presented a cooking series on television, including Madhur Jaffrey's Indian Cookery in 1982, Madhur Jaffrey's Far Eastern Cookery in 1989 and Madhur Jaffrey's Flavours of India in 1995. She lives in Manhattan and has a home in upstate New York. As a result of the success of her cookbooks and TV, Jaffrey developed a line of mass-marketed cooking sauces.

Ironically, she did not cook at all as a child growing up in Delhi. She had almost never been in the kitchen and almost failed cooking at school. It was only after she went to London at the age of 19 to study at RADA that she learned how to cook, using recipes of familiar dishes that were provided in correspondence from her mother. Her editor Judith Jones claimed in her memoirs that Jaffrey was an ideal cookbook writer precisely because she had learned to cook childhood comfort food as an adult, and primarily from written instructions. In the 1960s, after her award-winning performance in Shakespeare Wallah, she became known as the "actress who could cook".

After an article about her and her cooking appeared in the New York Times in 1966, she received a book contract from an independent editor to write a book on Indian cooking. Jaffrey started compiling all the recipes learnt by her through correspondence with her mother and adapted for the American kitchen. Due to a period of rapid consolidation in the American publishing industry, the book went to Harcourt Brace Jovanovich but got no attention there either. Jaffrey took the book to her friend, Ved Mehta, who in turn mentioned it to publisher André Schiffrin. Schiffrin passed on the book to Knopf editor Judith Jones, who had championed Julia Child's cookbook at a time when no other publisher would touch it. Judith Jones snapped up the book immediately, only asking Jaffrey to add serving suggestions and menus for people not familiar with Indian cooking. In 1973 An Invitation to Indian Cooking was published, Jaffrey's first cookbook. During the 1970s, she taught classes in Indian cooking, both at the James A. Beard School of Cooking and in her Manhattan apartment. She was hired by the BBC to present a show on Indian cooking. In 1986, the restaurant Dawat opened in Manhattan using recipes that she provided.

The social historian Panikos Panayi described her as the doyen of Indian cookery writers, but noted that their and her influence remained limited to Indian cuisine. Panayi commented that despite Jaffrey's description of "most Indian restaurants in Britain as 'second-class establishments that had managed to underplay their own regional uniqueness, most of her dishes too "do not appear on dining tables in India".

Awards
 Best Actress from the Berlin International Film Festival in 1965 for her performance in Shakespeare Wallah.
 Taraknath Das Foundation Award presented by the Taraknath Das Foundation of the Southern Asian Institute of Columbia University in 1993.
 Named to Who's Who of Food and Beverage in America by the James Beard Foundation in 1995.
 Muse Award presented by New York Women in Film & Television in 2000.
 Honorary CBE awarded on 11 October 2004 "in recognition of her services to cultural relations between the United Kingdom, India and the United States, through her achievements in film, television and cookery".
33rd Filmfare Awards - Filmfare Award for Best Supporting Actress - Saagar (Nominated)
In 2022, she was awarded the Padma Bhushan from the Government of India, which is the third Highest civilian award.

Family 
Madhur has three daughters from her marriage to Saeed Jaffrey: Zia, Meera and Sakina. Saeed Jaffrey's autobiography Saeed: An Actor's Journey (1998) describes their relationship in the early years of his life.
 
Zia Jaffrey is a part-time assistant professor of Creative Writing at The New School in New York City. She has written for newspapers like The New York Times and The Washington Post. Her work has also appeared in magazines like The Nation, Vogue, and Elle. She is the author of The Invisibles: A Tale of Eunuchs of India (1996) that explores the hijra community, whom she first encountered at a family wedding in Delhi in 1984. In 2013 she published The New Apartheid, a book on South Africa's AIDS epidemic.

Meera Jaffrey graduated from Oberlin College, Ohio, with a major in Chinese studies. She teaches in the Music Department of the Learning Community Charter School in Jersey City, New Jersey. In 2005 she traveled to China to shoot a documentary film, Fine Rain: Politics and Folk Songs in China, that explores China through its folk songs. Meera is married to Craig Bombardiere and the two have a son, Rohan Jaffrey.

Sakina Jaffrey picked up her love of Chinese culture from her elder sister, Meera. She graduated from Vassar College, New York with a major in Chinese studies and lived in Taiwan in her twenties. She is an actress, best known for her role as Linda Vasquez in the American television series House of Cards. She lives in Nyack, New York, with her husband, Francis Wilkinson, a journalist, and their two children, Cassius and Jamila.

Madhur Jaffrey is the aunt of the British journalist Rohit Jaggi and his sister the literary critic Maya Jaggi, their mother being Madhur's elder sister, Lalit.

Jaffrey is cousin to the late Raghu Raj Bahadur (1924–1997), considered to be one of the world's top theoretical statisticians, and his sister, the late Sheila Dhar (1929–2001) . In her memoirs Here's Someone I'd Like You to Meet (1995), Sheila Dhar recounts her difficult relationship with her father, referred to as Shibbudada in Jaffrey's own memoirs, Climbing the Mango Trees.

Bibliography

Cookbooks

Children's books
 Seasons of Splendour: Tales, Myths, and Legends of India (Pavilion, 1985) illustrated by Michael Foreman – 
 Market Days: From Market to Market Around the World (1995) illustrated by Marti Shohet – 
 Robi Dobi: The Marvelous Adventures of an Indian Elephant (1997) illustrated by Amanda Hall –

Memoirs
 Climbing the Mango Trees: A Memoir of a Childhood in India (2006) –

References

External links 
 
 
 Oral History Project by Judith Weinraub Interview #1  and Interview #2 

1933 births
Living people
20th-century Indian actresses
20th-century Indian women writers
20th-century Indian writers
21st-century American women
21st-century Indian actresses
21st-century Indian women writers
21st-century Indian writers
Alumni of RADA
American actresses of Indian descent
American food writers
American women non-fiction writers
American women writers of Indian descent
British chefs
British television chefs
Chefs of Indian cuisine
Cookbook writers
Delhi University alumni
Honorary Commanders of the Order of the British Empire
Indian chefs
Indian emigrants to England
Indian emigrants to the United States
Indian film actresses
Indian food writers
Indian stage actresses
Indian television actresses
Indian television presenters
Indian women television presenters
James Beard Foundation Award winners
The New Yorker people
People from Chelsea, Manhattan
People from Delhi
People from Hillsdale, New York
Silver Bear for Best Actress winners
Vegetarian cookbook writers
Women chefs
Women cookbook writers
Women food writers
Women writers from Delhi